Fabrice Ehret (born 28 September 1979) is a Swiss-born French former footballer who played as a left midfielder. Ehret has played for the French U-21 selection. Former Anderlecht coach Hugo Broos described him as "a player who can control the whole left flank and also is strong in attack".

References

External links
  
 

1979 births
Living people
Sportspeople from Lugano
Swiss-French people
French footballers
Swiss men's footballers
French people of Swiss descent
Swiss people of French descent
Association football midfielders
FC Mulhouse players
RC Strasbourg Alsace players
R.S.C. Anderlecht players
FC Aarau players
1. FC Köln players
Thonon Evian Grand Genève F.C. players
Ligue 1 players
Belgian Pro League players
Bundesliga players
2. Bundesliga players
French expatriate footballers
Swiss expatriate footballers
Expatriate footballers in Belgium
French expatriate sportspeople in Belgium
Swiss expatriate sportspeople in Belgium
Expatriate footballers in Germany
French expatriate sportspeople in Germany
Swiss expatriate sportspeople in Germany